Jeffrey Howard Tigay (born December 25, 1941) is a modern biblical scholar who is best known for the study of Deuteronomy and in his contributions to the Deuteronomy volume of the JPS Torah Commentary (1996).

Biography 

Jeffrey H. Tigay was born in Detroit in 1941.  Educated at Columbia University and gaining his B.A. in 1963, he continued toward rabbinic ordination at the Jewish Theological Seminary of America (M.H.L., 1966).
He earned his Ph.D. in Comparative Biblical and Ancient Near Eastern Studies from Yale University. Tigay taught in the Jewish Studies program at the University of Pennsylvania from 1971 until his retirement in 2010, and is currently the A.M. Ellis Professor of Hebrew and Semitic Languages and Literatures, Emeritus.

Works 
Literary-Critical Studies in the Gilgamesh Epic: an Assyriological contribution to Biblical literary criticism (Yale University Press, 1971)
The Evolution of the Gilgamesh Epic (University of Pennsylvania Press, 1982)
Empirical Models for Biblical Criticism (University of Pennsylvania Press, 1985)
You Shall Have No Other Gods. Israelite Religion in the Light of Hebrew Inscriptions (Harvard Semitic Studies/Scholars Press, 1986)
Studies in Midrash and related literature co-authored with Judah Goldin, Barry L. Eichler (Jewish Publication Society, 1988)
Deuteronomy (Devarim): the traditional Hebrew text with the new JPS translation (Jewish Publication Society, 1996)
Tehillah le-Moshe: Biblical and Judaic studies in honor of Moshe Greenberg co-authored with Moshe Greenberg, Mordechai Cogan, Barry L. Eichler (Eisenbrauns, 1997)

References

External links
Jeffrey H. Tigay's faculty profile

1941 births
Living people
Jewish biblical scholars
American biblical scholars
20th-century American Jews
University of Pennsylvania faculty
Yale University alumni
Columbia University alumni
20th-century Jewish biblical scholars
21st-century American Jews